Adam Sutherland may refer to:
 Adam Sutherland (fl. from 1999), curator, director of Grizedale Arts
 Adam Sutherland (fl. from 1998), Scots fiddler
 Adam Gerard Sutherland, a character in On Dublin Street by Samantha Young

See also
 Gower Ross or Adam Gower Sutherland de Ross (1890–1917), Australian rules footballer